Zeba is a Serbo-Croatian language surname from a nickname meaning "finch" in Serbo-Croatian. Notable people with the name include:
 Emir Zeba (1989), Bosnian-Herzegovinian retired football player
 Josip Zeba (1990), Croatian professional footballer
 Zajko Zeba (1983), Bosnian professional footballer

Serbo-Croatian-language surnames
Surnames from nicknames